Helina allotalla is a Palearctic fly from the family Muscidae.

Description
See Morphology of Diptera for terms.
The eyes are separated by less than 3 times the width of  the third antenna! segment.
Prealar bristle well developed, about two-thirds the length of second notopleural bristle.
The abdomen has at most indistinct narrow paired spots. Arista. wider than third antennal segment. 6–8 mm.

References

Muscidae
Diptera of Europe
Taxa named by Johann Wilhelm Meigen
Insects described in 1830